"Sweet Little Baby Boy" is a Christmas song written by James Brown and Nat Jones. It was released as a two-part single in 1966. Both parts also appeared on the album James Brown and His Famous Flames Sing Christmas Songs (also released as James Brown Sings Christmas Songs).

James Brown songs
Songs written by James Brown
1966 singles
American Christmas songs
Songs about children